Revenge is a full-length studio album by German heavy metal band Paragon, released in 2005.

Track listing
 "Intro / Impaler" – 4:47
 "Assassins" – 4:16
 "Traitor" – 5:13
 "Masters Of The Seas" – 9:24
 "Revenge" – 4:20
 "Symphony Of Pain" – 4:23
 "Beyond The Veil" – 7:59
 "The Battle Rages On" – 4:43
 "Art Of War" – 3:19
 "Empire Of The Lost" – 5:42
 "The Gods Made Heavy Metal" (Manowar cover) – 5:08

Credits 
 Andreas Babuschkin - Lead vocals
 Martin Christian - Guitars / Backing vocals
 Günny Kruse - Guitars / Backing vocals
 Jan Bünning - Bass guitar / Backing vocals
 Markus Corby - Drums

All songs written and arranged by Paragon, except "Empire Of The Lost" by: Piet Sielck / Paragon.

2005 albums
Paragon (band) albums